Robert John Hailey (born 25 July 1951) is a former English cricketer. Hailey was a right-handed batsman who bowled slow left-arm orthodox. He was born in Gosforth, Northumberland.

Hailey made his debut for Hertfordshire in the 1978 Minor Counties Championship against Norfolk. Hailey played Minor counties cricket for Hertfordshire from 1978 to 1988, which included 67 Minor Counties Championship matches and 12 MCCA Knockout Trophy matches. He made his List A debut for the Minor Counties cricket team against Derbyshire in the 1982 Benson & Hedges Cup, in what was his only appearance for the team. His debut in List A cricket for Hertfordshire came against Hampshire in the 1983 NatWest Trophy. He made 5 further List A appearances for the county, the last coming against Middlesex in the 1988 NatWest Trophy. In his 6 List A matches for the county, he took 6 wickets at an average of 35.33, with best figures of 4/32.

References

External links

1952 births
Living people
People from Gosforth
Cricketers from Tyne and Wear
English cricketers
Hertfordshire cricketers
Minor Counties cricketers